LG Optimus L5 (also marketed as LG Swift L5) is a slate smartphone designed and manufactured by LG Electronics. Optimus L5 is the mid-range handset in the L series, and it makes the transition to Android 4.0.

Hardware
LG Optimus L5 comes with an 800 MHz single-core Qualcomm MSM7225A CPU and an Adreno 200 GPU. The phone has a 4"-diagonal TFT capacitive touchscreen, displaying 16.7 million colours at 320×480 pixels.

The L5 has four physical keys: a power button at the top, volume up/down buttons on the left side, and the Home button at the front; as well as capacitive Back and Menu keys at either side of the Home button.

The device has a 5-megapixel camera with auto-focus and flash. The camera cover glass, though, is not scratch-resistant. Other standout features include NFC, Wi-Fi hotspot functionality, and an FM radio with RDS support.

The FM radio app has functionality to scan for radio stations that are put into an auto-generated stations list, out of which the user can select six favorites as channel presets. Each new scan wipes the list and the presets clean.

Software
The phone comes with the LG-bundled QuickMemo app, with a button in quick settings. On tapping the QuickMemo button, the app captures a screenshot, and then offers a user interface to add and save the screenshot with or without annotations to the phone's gallery.

The device was released with Android 4.0.3 Ice Cream Sandwich (ICS), and depending on the operating system build level, can receive at least two OTA updates. The upgrade to Android 4.1.2 Jelly Bean must be performed through LG connectivity software on a Windows-enabled computer.

As of late 2018, the built-in weather app and widgets provided by Yahoo in Android 4.0.3 have stopped updating weather data. The Yahoo Weather app can be disabled in system settings, and a user can install a different weather app and widget of their choice. The upgrade to Android 4.1.2 introduces a new default weather app and widget provided by AccuWeather.

Since December 7, 2018, Android 4.0.x is no longer supported by Google Play Services with updates. This means, that phones continue to function and connect to a Google account, and while they may receive the latest available version to this component, then no further updates to Play Services will be installed, unless the operating system is updated or upgraded. Google's major communications apps, such as GMail and Hangouts, continue to work on ICS.

The Google Play Services component automatically updates in the background when connected to the Internet through a mobile or Wi-Fi network. Occasionally, the phone slows down during this update process, as and when a new version of Play Services is released.

In late May 2020, the YouTube app ceased support for Android 4.1. The YouTube mobile site continues to be accessible from the default browser.

See also
 LG Optimus
 List of LG mobile phones
 Comparison of smartphones

References

External links
 Software download page for LGE610 (LG Australia site) — Provides the USB driver, the LG Mobile Support Tool, and the LG PC Suite. All three must be installed, though the LG PC Suite is the central one to perform backups and updates with. The LG Mobile Support Tool may install firmware specific to the country or region where the phone is located at.
Version 5.3.27.20180328 (build 18360) of LG PC Suite also works on Windows XP SP3 and supports devices with Android 4.0 ICS. (Other-country sections of the site offer LG PC Suite versions that support Android 4.1 and up.)
The license and terms of service box of LG Mobile Support Tool 1.8.9.0 can easily exceed the height of the screen (768px), with no way to scroll down to the 'OK' button. If the display is wide enough, then one remedy is to use the display OSD, or the computer's video adapter software (if available) to temporarily rotate the visible display output sideways 90° or 270° to reach those buttons.

Android (operating system) devices
LG Electronics smartphones
Discontinued smartphones